Children of the Corn 666: Isaac's Return is a 1999 American supernatural slasher directed by Kari Skogland and starring Nancy Allen, Natalie Ramsey, John Franklin, and Stacy Keach. It is the sixth film in the Children of the Corn series.

The film is notable for being the first film in the series to feature John Franklin reprising his role as Isaac, who hadn't been seen since the first film, and for being the first of the straight-to-video sequels to actually have some narrative connection to the original film.

Plot
Hannah, born in the original Gatlin, Nebraska cult led by nefarious prophet Isaac, visits the town to find her birth mother. After having a mysterious encounter with a street preacher, Zachariah, Hannah crashes her car in a cornfield. She is escorted to the hospital by the sheriff, Cora, where she is examined by Dr. Michaels. There, Hannah finds that Isaac—long thought dead—has actually been hospitalized in a coma for years.

After she leaves the hospital and resumes her journey, she is nearly driven off the road by a mysterious truck. After checking into a motel, she meets a pair of romantically-involved teenagers in the motel office, the standoffish Morgan and her boyfriend, Matt. The following day, as Hannah leaves, a small crowd gathers around her car, fascinated by her. Meanwhile, Isaac awakens from is coma and learns he has a son. Hannah returns to the hospital and encounters Gabriel, who helps her find her birth certificate. She is attacked by Jake, who attempts to kill her with an axe, but he is stopped by Gabriel.

Hannah experiences a number of strange visions, and learns that the woman who attempted to force her off the road was Rachel Colby, Hannah's birthmother. At the town church, Rachel confronts Isaac, who accuses her of betrayal. Dr. Michaels acts as a confidant to Rachel, urging her to stop Isaac. Shortly after, Isaac kills Dr. Michaels before approaching Matt, revealed to be his son whom he hopes will carry on his legacy. Meanwhile, Rachel confronts Hannah, whom claims she long believed to be dead, but is evasive regarding the events surrounding Hannah's birth, only commenting that it has been prophesied that Hannah would return to Gatlin on the eve of her nineteenth birthday.

That night, the cult gathers in the cornfield under Isaac's command, branding Matt as the first of the "chosen". Hannah arrives, and is injected with a sedative by the cultists. The cult begins a union ceremony between Matt and Hannah, but Hannah escapes. Rachel appears at the gathering, claiming Isaac is a false prophet.  Morgan attempts to intervene to help Hannah, only to be bisected by Isaac with a machete. Gabriel flees, uniting with Hannah in a barn, where the two have sex. Matt proceeds to commit suicide by falling on a scythe.

Rachel is held captive on the hospital basement. Gabriel kills Jesse before Hannah confronts Isaac, who believes himself to be "He Who Walks Behind the Rows".    Gabriel, utilizing his supernatural powers, forces Cora to shoot herself to death, before confronting Isaac with the revelation that he was in fact the firstborn child of Isaac's cult, and that Isaac denied him his birthright in favor of his own son.

Gabriel instruct Hannah to kill Isaac, but Rachel urges her not to. He then reveals himself to be fully possessed by "He Who Walks Behind the Rows". Gabriel restrains Isaac with his supernatural powers, killing him with a broken lead pipe. Rachel subsequently stabs Gabriel. Rachel and Hannah flee as Gabriel remarks that "The seeds have already been sown". Gabriel's wound miraculously heals itself, and he begins to set off explosions, killing Jake. 

Rachel and Hannah leave on foot, walking down a country road. Hannah is unaware of what Gabriel's words meant—that she is currently pregnant with the child of "He Who Walks Behind the Rows", continuing the cult's legacy.

Cast

Release
The film, just like the last three installments before it, was not theatrically released but went direct-to-video on October 19, 1999 on VHS and DVD formats.

The film debuted on the Blu-ray format for the first time via Echo Bridge Entertainment on May 15, 2011. It was included in a double feature with its predecessor that was also making its Blu-ray debut, Children of the Corn V: Fields of Terror (1998).

Reception
On review aggregator Rotten Tomatoes, Children of the Corn 666: Isaac's Return holds an approval rating of 0% based on five reviews.

See also
 Children of the Corn (film series)
 List of adaptations of works by Stephen King

References

Sources

External links
 

Direct-to-video sequel films
1999 direct-to-video films
1990s slasher films
1990s English-language films
Films about cults
Films about religion
American slasher films
Direct-to-video horror films
Films set in Nebraska
Children of the Corn
Miramax films
Dimension Films films
1999 horror films
1999 films
Films directed by Kari Skogland
1990s American films